The men's keirin competition at the 2023 UEC European Track Championships will be held on 12 February 2023.

Results

First round
The first two riders in each heat qualified for the second round, and all other riders advanced to the first round repechages.

Heat 1

Heat 2

Heat 3

Heat 4

Repechage
The first rider in each heat qualify to the second round.

Heat 1

Heat 2

Heat 3

Heat 4

Second round
The first three riders in each heat qualify to final 1–6, all other riders advance to final 7–12.

Heat 1

Heat 2

Final
Small final

Final

References

Men's keirin
European Track Championships – Men's keirin